Hsieh Wu-ch'iao, also known as Kelly Hsieh, is a Taiwanese politician who has served as the Representative to the United Kingdom for Taiwan since 24 July 2020.

Education
Hsieh obtained his bachelor's degree in diplomacy from National Chengchi University.

Representative to the United Kingdom 
Hsieh succeeded David Lin as Taiwan's representative to the United Kingdom on the 24th of July 2020 after Lin's retirement announcement from the position the month prior in June.

Invitation to the state funeral of Elizabeth II 
Despite Taiwan not having any official diplomatic relations with the United Kingdom, Hsieh, as the ROC's representative to the United Kingdom was "specially invited" by the British government to add Taiwan's condolences to the condolence book of Elizabeth II at Lancaster House in London on the 18th of September 2022.

References

Living people
National Chengchi University alumni
Representatives of Taiwan to the United Kingdom
Taiwanese Ministers of Foreign Affairs
Year of birth missing (living people)
Representatives of Taiwan to Thailand
Representatives of Taiwan to Russia